Dnipropetrovsk Oblast, also referred to as Dnipropetrovshchyna, is an oblast (province) of southeastern Ukraine, the most important industrial region of the country. It was created on February 27, 1932. Dnipropetrovsk Oblast has a population of about  approximately 80% of whom live centering on administrative centers: Dnipro, Kryvyi Rih, Kamianske, Nikopol and Pavlohrad. The Dnieper River runs through the oblast. 

In 2019, the Constitutional Court of Ukraine approved the change of the oblast's name to Sicheslav Oblast. The change is not yet implemented.

Geography
The Dnipropetrovsk Oblast is located in southeastern Ukraine. The area of the oblast (31,974 km2) comprises about 5.3% of the total area of the country. Its longitude from north to south is 130 km, from east to west – 300 km. The oblast borders the Poltava and Kharkiv Oblasts on the north, the Donetsk Oblast on the east, the Zaporizhzhia and Kherson Oblasts on the south, and the Mykolayiv and Kirovohrad Oblasts on the west.

The Black Sea Lowland covers about half of the territory of the oblast. In Ternivka, a meteorite crater is located. The crater is not exposed at the surface. The Dnieper Upland contains a number of minerals including iron, manganese, granite, graphite, brown coal, and kaolin. Kryvbas is an important economic region, specializing in iron ore mining and the steel industry. It is arguably the main iron ore region of Eastern Europe. Named after the city of Kryvyi Rih, the region occupies the southwestern part of the Dnipropetrovsk Oblast, as well as a small neighboring part of the Kirovohrad Oblast.

The region possesses major deposits of iron ore and some other metallurgical ores. To exploit them, several large mining companies were founded here in the middle of the 20th century. Most of them are located in Kryvyi Rih itself, which is the longest city in Europe.

Geology 
Much of the Dnipropetrovsk region is located within the boundaries of the Ukrainian Shield and only the northern regions and the extreme eastern part of the territory are confined to the south-eastern side of the Dnipro-Donets depression.

In the geological structure of the region, the breeds come from the archaea, the Proterozoic, the Paleozoic, the Mesozoic and the Cenozoic.

History

In the 6th and 8th centuries, the first settlements of Slavs appeared on the banks of the Dnieper within the region. During the period of Kievan Rus' (9-12 centuries AD) the Dnieper River was one of the main trade routes of medieval Eastern Europe called "From the Varangians to the Greeks", which connected the Baltic countries with the Crimea and the capital of Byzantium, Constantinople. The Dnieper also served as a major route for transporting the army of Kyiv princes on their way to the Byzantine coastal cities in the early 9th and late 9th centuries.

At the beginning of the 15th century, Tatar tribes inhabiting the right bank of the Dnieper were driven away by the Grand Duchy of Lithuania. However, by the mid-15th century, the Nogai (who lived north of the Sea of Azov) and the Crimean Khanate invaded these lands.  The Grand Duchy of Lithuania and the Crimean Khanate agreed to a border along the Dnieper, and farther east along the Samara River, i.e. through what is today the city of Dnipro. It was in this time that there appeared a new force, the Cossacks, armed freemen not subject to any feudal lord who were to soon dominate the region. They later became known as Zaporozhian Cossacks, from Zaporizhzhia, the lands south of Naddniprianshchyna, which translates as "the Land Beyond the Weirs [Rapids]"). This was a period of raids and fighting causing considerable devastation and depopulation in that area; the area became known as the 'Wilderness'.

In 1635, the Polish Government built the Kodak fortress above the Dnieper Rapids at Kodaky, partly as a result of rivalry in the region between Poland, Turkey and the Crimean Khanate, and partly to maintain control over Cossack activity (i.e. to suppress the Cossack raiders and to prevent peasants moving out of the area). On the night of 3 or 4 August 1635, the Cossacks of Ivan Sulyma captured the fort by surprise, burning it down and butchering the garrison of about 200 West European mercenaries under Jean Marion. The fort was rebuilt by French engineer Guillaume Le Vasseur de Beauplan for the Polish Government in 1638, and had a mercenary garrison. Kodak was captured by Zaporozhian Cossacks on 1 October 1648, and was garrisoned by the Cossacks until its demolition in accordance with the Treaty of the Pruth in 1711.

Under the Treaty of Pereyaslav of 1654, the territory became part of the Russian Empire. In 1774 Prince Grigori Potemkin was appointed governor of Novorossiysk Governorate, and after the destruction of the Zaporozhian Sich, he started founding cities in the region and encouraging foreign settlers. The city of Yekaterinoslav was founded in 1776, not in the current location, but at the confluence of the River Samara with the River Kil'chen' at Loshakivka, north of the Dnieper. On May 8, 1775, after the end of the Russian-Turkish War, Russian authorities opened a postal station and track which linked Kremenchuk, Kinburn foreland and Ochakiv, all locations of the Imperial Russian Army.

In December 1796, Paul I reestablished the Novorossiysk Governorate, mostly with land from the former Yekaterinoslav Viceroyalty. In 1802, this province was divided into the Nikolayev Governorate (known as the Kherson Governorate from 1803), Yekaterinoslav Governorate, and the Taurida Governorate. Its capital was the city of Yekaterinoslav (modern Dnipro) created in 1802 out the Yekaterinoslav Vice-regency. It was located within the former lands of Zaporizhian Sich. The government bordered to the north with the Kharkov Governorate and Poltava Governorate, to the west and southwest with the Kherson Governorate, to the south with the Taurida Governorate and Sea of Azov, and to the east with Don Host Oblast.

Olexander Paul discovered and initiated iron ore investigation and production, and this in turn caused the formation of a mining district. In 1874 Alexander II initiated the founding project of a railway, running . This enabled transportation directly to the nearest factories and greatly sped up the development of the region.

On 1 August 1925, the Yekaterinoslav Governorate administration was discontinued, and in 1926 the city of Yekterinoslav was renamed Dnipropetrovsk after communist leader Grigory Petrovsky. Before the introduction of oblasts in 1932, the Ukrainian SSR comprised 40 okrugs, which had replaced the former Russian Imperial guberniya (governorate) subdivisions. In 1932 the territory of the Ukrainian SSR was re-established based on oblasts. The first oblasts were Vinnytsia Oblast, Kyiv Oblast, Odessa Oblast, Kharkiv Oblast, and Dnipropetrovsk Oblast. Soon after that in the summer of 1932 Donetsk Oblast was formed out of eastern parts of Kharkiv and Dnipropetrovsk.

During the Holodomor in the 1930s, more than 200 collective farms in Dnipropetrovsk Oblast were put on "Blackboards" which was a complete blockade of trade and food aid to villages under performing in grain procurement quotas; a number representing more than half of all such "Blackboards" throughout all of the Ukrainian SSR.

During the 1991 referendum, 90.36% of votes in Dnipropetrovsk Oblast were in favor of the Declaration of Independence of Ukraine. A survey conducted in December 2014 by the Kyiv International Institute of Sociology found 2.2% of the oblast's population supported their region joining Russia, 89.9% did not support the idea, and the rest were undecided or did not respond.

The city of Dnipropetrovsk was renamed Dnipro in May 2016 as part of the decommunization laws enacted a year earlier. Dnipropetrovsk Oblast was not renamed because it is mentioned as such in the Constitution of Ukraine, and the oblast can only be renamed by a constitutional amendment. In April 2018 a group of over a hundred deputies formally initiated a proposal in the Ukrainian Parliament to change the name to Sicheslav Oblast; in February 2019, the Verkhovna Rada voted to officially amend the Constitution thus granting state sanction to the name change. Later that year the Constitutional Court officially approved the change. The oblast's administrative centre and largest city, Dnipro, had the unofficial name "Sicheslav" in 1918–21 during the Ukrainian War of Independence, commemorating the Zaporizhian Sich. Since then, the renaming process has stalled (as of 2023), with reasons such as the 2019 presidential and parliamentary elections, the COVID-19 pandemic and the 2022 Russian invasion of Ukraine being cited.

During the 2022 Russian Invasion of Ukraine the cities of Dnipro, Kryvyi Rih, and Nikopol, among other locations in the region, were bombed by Russia. Russian troops also shelled the village of Ternove and surrounding areas. Reports from Ukrainian military groups suggest this village alongside Berezove, Novoheorhiivka and Zaporizke were attacked and then occupied for an unknown period of time, evincing that the Russian troops entered Dnipropetrovsk Oblast. Ukrainian military claimed to have cleared Russian troops from the village on March 14, 2022. It was also reported Russian troops were pushed from areas near Dnipropetrovsk Oblast and Kherson Oblast, near the border. Hannivka was occupied, liberated, and shelled during the invasion. However, as of September 2022, there has been no ground fighting and the oblast remains completely under Ukrainian control.

Administrative subdivisions

The following data incorporates the number of each type of administrative divisions of the Dnipropetrovsk Oblast:
 Administrative center – 1 (Dnipro)
 Raions – 7;
 City raions – 18 (Dnipro – 8, Kryvyi Rih – 7, Kamianske −3);
 Settlements – 1504, including:
 Villages – 1438;
 Cities/Towns – 66, including:
 Urban-type settlement – 46;
 Cities – 20.
 Silradas – 288.

The local administration of the oblast is controlled by the Dnipropetrovsk Oblast Rada. The governor of the oblast is the Dnipropetrovsk Oblast Rada speaker, appointed by the President of Ukraine.

Since July 2020, Dnipropetrovsk Oblast consists of the following seven raions:
 Dnipro Raion;
 Kamianske Raion;
 Kryvyi Rih Raion;
 Nikopol Raion;
 Novomoskovsk Raion;
 Pavlohrad Raion;
 Synelnykove Raion.

Demographics

Its population in 2004 was 3,493,062, which constituted 5.3% of the overall Ukrainian population.

At the 2001 census, the ethnic groups within the Dnipropetrovsk Oblast were:

 Ukrainians – 79.3%,
 Russians – 17.6%,
 Belarusians – 0.8%,
 Jews – 0.4%,
 Armenians – 0.3%,
 Azeris – 0.2%,
 Moldovans – 0.12%,
 Romanis – 0.11%,
 Tatars – 0.11%,
 Germans – 0.11%,
 Other – 0.95%;

the groups by native language:

 Ukrainian 67%,
Russian 32%,
 other languages 1%.

Age structure
 0–14 years: 14.1%  (male 241,006/female 226,216)
 15–64 years: 70.2%  (male 1,100,602/female 1,219,668)
 65 years and over: 15.7%  (male 168,447/female 348,547) (2013 official)

Median age
 total: 40.3 years 
 male: 36.6 years 
 female: 43.9 years  (2013 official)

Religion

A Pew survey of Dnipropetrovsk residents' religious self-identification showed the following distribution of affiliations: Ukrainian Orthodox Church (Moscow Patriarchate) 47.5%, Ukrainian Orthodox Church of the Kyivan Patriarchate 10.7%, Roman Catholic 1.3%, Ukrainian Autocephalous Orthodox Church 0.8%, Protestantism 32.3%.

Dnipropetrovsk has one of the most balanced percentage of religious people in the nation mainly due to large number of ethnic groups. The Jewish community is centered in the Dnipro (Golden Rose Synagogue) and Kryvyi Rih area, and emerged during a wave of Jewish immigration.

Cities and towns
There are 20 cities and towns in Dnipro. Major population centers today result from historical factors — with the advent of the iron development took place predominantly along the Kryvyi Rih and Dnipro, a city located on the Dnieper. Kryvyi Rih is the center of a large metropolitan area called Kryvyi Rih Metropolitan Region.

Ranked by population, the oblast's 12 largest municipalities are:

  Dnipro (1,080,846)
  Kryvyi Rih (662,507)
  Kamianske (262,704)
  Nikopol (136,280)
  Pavlohrad (118,816)
  Novomoskovsk (72,439)
  Zhovti Vody (54,370)
  Pokrov (46,532)
  Synelnykove (32,302)
  Ternivka (29,253)
  Pershotravensk (29,140)
  Vilnohirsk (23,782)

Transport

There are eight over-Dnieper bridges and dozens of grade-separated intersections. Several new intersections are under construction. European route E105 cross Left-bank Dnipro from North to South. Highway M04 (Ukraine) and Highway M18 (Ukraine) cross River Dnieper and Dnipro from West to East, entering Kryvyi Rih. Overall, roads are in poor technical condition and maintained inadequately.

Near-Dnipro Railway (NDZ), headquartered in Dnipro, is a component part of the Ukrzaliznytsia (UZ) company. NDR's route map includes all the railroads in the Dnipropetrovsk, Zaporizhya, Kharkiv, Kherson and Crimea oblasts (provinces of Ukraine).

As of 2008, NDR's rail system included 3,275 km (2,035 mi) of track, of which 93,3% were electrified. The PDR consists of five sections (directions), the Dnipropetrovsk, Zaporizhzhia, Kryvyi Rih, and Crimea directions. There are 244 railway stations in the NDR system. More than a dozen elektrichka stops are located within the city allowing residents of different neighborhoods to use the suburban trains.

The cities of Dnipro and Kryvyi Rih are served by a local sales-tax-funded bus, tram, metro and trolleybus systems.

Dnipro International Airport is the only international airport in the state and serves as one of the hubs for Dniproavia. The airport has non-stop service to over 20 destinations throughout Ukraine, Russia, and Turkey, as well as to Vienna and Tel Aviv. Kryvyi Rih International Airport provides limited commercial air service.

Environment

The oblast is situated in the steppe region. Forests in the oblast occupy about 3.9% of the oblast's total territory. The average temperature in the winter balances from −3 to −5 °C and in the summer from 22 to 24 °C. The average annual rainfall is 400–490 mm. During the summer, Dnipropetrovsk oblast is very warm (average day temperature in July is 24 to 28 °C (75 to 82 °F), even hot sometimes 34 to 38 °C (90 to 97 °F). Temperatures as high as 36 °C (97 °F) have been recorded in May. Winter is not so cold (average day temperature in January is −3 to 0 °C (25 to 32 °F), but when there is no snow and the wind blows hard, it feels extremely cold. A mix of snow and rain happens usually in December.

The tender climate, mineral sources, and the curative mud allow opportunities for rest and cure within the region. Here there are 21 health-centers and medicated pensions, 10 rest homes, recreation departments and rest camps for children.

The Dnipropetrovsk Oblast has splendid flora and fauna. Here, there are more than 1700 kinds of vegetation, 7500 kinds of animals (including elk, wild boar, dappled deer, roe, hare, fox, wolf, etc.) There are also 114 park and nature objects, including 15 state reserves; 3 nature memorials, 24 local parks; 7 landscape parks; 3 park tracts, which altogether make up approximately 260 square kilometres.

217 rivers flow within the area, including 55 rivers which are longer than 25 km, the major one being the Dnieper, which crosses through the center of the oblast. Also flowing through the region are three major reservoirs, the Kamianske, Dnieper and Kakhovka, and the Dnieper-Kryvyi Rih Canal.

Economy
The Dnipropetrovsk Oblast has a high industry potential. There are 712 basic industrial organizations, including 20 different types of economic activity with about 473,4 thousand workers. The area also produces about 16.9% of the total industry production of Ukraine. This places the Dnipropetrovsk Oblast second in Ukraine (after the neighbouring Donetsk Oblast).

Dnipro is a major industrial centre of Ukraine. It has several facilities devoted to heavy industry that produce a wide range of products, including cast-iron, rolled metal, pipes, machinery, different mining combines, agricultural equipment, tractors, trolleybuses, refrigerators, different chemicals and many others.  The most famous and the oldest (founded in the 19th century) is the Metallurgical Plant named after Petrovsky. The city also has big food processing and light industry factories. Many sewing and dress-making factories work for France, Canada, Germany and Great Britain , using the most advanced technologies, materials and design. Dnipro also formerly dominated in the aerospace industry since the 1950s: engineering department Yuzhnoye Design Bureau and construction at Pivdenmash.

Pivdenmash, the former Yuzhmash, is a manufacturer of space rockets, agricultural equipment, buses, trolley buses, trams, wind turbines, and satellites that was inherited from the Soviet Union. It is a large state-owned company located in Dnipro.

Dniproavia, an airline, has its head office on the grounds of Dnipropetrovsk International Airport.
The region possesses major deposits of iron ore and some other metallurgical ores. To exploit them, several large mining companies were founded here in the middle of the 20th century. Most of them are located in Kryvyi Rih itself, which is the longest city in Europe. Steel companies of the region (except Mittal Steel-owned Kryvorizhstal) are controlled by either the Privat Group or the SCM. From the 1990s until 2004, these once united and state-owned industries went through a hard and scandal-ridden process of privatization. Being a business oligarch entity, Privat Group controls some prominent Ukrainian media, maintains close relations with politicians and sponsors professional sports. Key businesses of the group (including the PrivatBank itself) are based in Dnipropetrovsk Oblast, which is regarded as its "homeland". Group's founding owners are natives of Dnipropetrovsk and made their entire career there.

ArcelorMittal Kryvyi Rih, owned by ArcelorMittal since 2005 is the largest private company by revenue in Ukraine, producing over 7 million tonnes of crude steel, and mined over 17 million tonnes of iron ore. As of 2011, the company employed about 37,000 people. 4 Iron Ore Enrichment Works of Metinvest are a large contributors to the UA's balance of payments. The third giant – Evraz mining company.

Education

Colleges and universities

Dnipropetrovsk has several colleges and universities:

 Dnipro State Medical University
 Alfred Nobel University
 Oles Honchar Dnipro National University
 Dnipro Polytechnic
 State Chemical Technology University of Ukraine
 Dnipro State Technical University of Railway Transport
 Prednieper State Academy of Construction and Architecture
 Dnipropetrovsk State University of Internal Affairs
 National Metallurgical Academy of Ukraine
 Dnipro Medical Institute of Conventional and Alternative Medicine
 Dniprovskyi State Technical University
 Kryvyi Rih University
 Kryvyi Rih State Pedagogical University
 Kryvyi Rih State University of Economics and Technology

Sport

Region houses the Ukrainian Premier League football club, FC Dnipro. This club, commonly seen as representing the city at large, holds a record for being the only Soviet team to win the USSR Federation Cup twice; since independence they have gone on to win the Ukrainian Championship once and the Ukrainian League Cup three times. Kryvyi Rih was home to the football team Kryvbas Kryvyi Rih. FC Hirnyk Kryvyi Rih is a club based in Kryvyi Rih. The club currently competes in the Ukrainian First League. It is part of the Sports Club Hirnyk which combines several other sections. The club's owner is the Kryvyi Rih Iron Ore Combine (KZRK), the biggest subterranean mining public company in Ukraine.
SC Kryvbas is a professional basketball club. Achievements of the team are winning the Ukrainian Basketball League in 2009, and winning the Higher League in 2003 and 2004. Since 2010 the team is active in the Ukrainian Basketball SuperLeague.

Recently built Dnipro-Arena has a capacity of 31,003 people. The Dnipro-Arena hosted the 2010 FIFA World Cup qualification game between Ukraine and England on 10 October 2009. The Dnipro Arena was initially chosen as one of the Ukrainian venues for their joint Euro 2012 bid with Poland. However it was dropped from the list in May 2009 as the capacity fell short of the minimum 33,000 seats required by UEFA.

Dnipropetrovsk has a regional federation within Ukrainian bandy and Rink Bandy Federation.

Culture
Historically, Dnieper Ukraine comprised territory that roughly corresponded to the area of Ukraine within the expanding Russian Empire. Ukrainians sometimes call it Great Ukraine (Velyka Ukrayina). Historically, this region is tightly entwined with the history of Ukraine and is considered the heart of the country.

Ukrainian (Middle Dnieprian dialect, 67,0%) and Russian (31,9%) language are both equally used officially, with Russian being more common in cities, while Ukrainian is the dominant language in rural communities. These details result in a significant difference across different survey results, as even a small restating of a question switches responses of a significant group of people. The speaking of Surzhyk instead of Russian or Ukrainian is wide and viewed negatively by nationalist language activists. Because it is neither the one nor the other, they regard Surzhyk as a threat to the uniqueness of Ukrainian culture.

Petrykivsky Painting originates from Petrykivka village. The distinctive features of this handicraft are the patterns, unusual technique and white background. It was included to the UNESCO Representative List of the Intangible Cultural Heritage of Humanity.

Notable people from Dnipropetrovsk Oblast 
 Helena Blavatsky – Russian occultist, philosopher, and author who co-founded the Theosophical Society
 Leonid Brezhnev – General Secretary of the Central Committee of the Communist Party of the Soviet Union
 Marharyta Dorozhon – Ukrainian/Israeli Olympic javelin thrower
 Ihor Kolomoyskyi
 Tihon Konstantinov – Moldavian SSR and Moldavian ASSR politician
 Leonid Kuchma – second President of independent Ukraine
 Yulia Tymoshenko – politician and businesswoman
 Pavlo Lazarenko – former Prime Minister of Ukraine
 Viktor Pinchuk
 Mikhail Nekrich
 Oksana Baiul – figure skater; 1993 World champion and 1994 Olympic champion in ladies' singles
 The Lubavitcher Rebbe – Orthodox rabbi, and third Rebbe (spiritual leader) of the Chabad Lubavitch chasidic movement
 Samuel Seidlin –  endocrinologist and nuclear medicine pioneer
 Dmytro Yavornytsky
 Valeriy Lobanovskyi
 Oleksandr Oksanchenko – fighter pilot killed in the Battle of Kyiv in 2022
 Oles Honchar
 Olexander Paul
 Volodymyr Zelensky – current President of Ukraine

Landmarks

The following historical-cultural sites were nominated to the Seven Wonders of Ukraine.
  Tomb of kosh otaman Sirko
  Troitsk Cathedral
  Church of Virgin Mary Birth
  The walls of Ukrainian defensive line
  Kurgan stelae or Balbals are anthropomorphic stone stelae, images cut from stone, installed atop, within or around kurgans (i.e. tumuli), in kurgan cemeteries, or in a double line extending from a kurgan. The stelae are also described as "obelisks" or "statue menhirs". Spanning more than three millennia, they are clearly the product of various cultures. The earliest are associated with the Pit Grave culture of the Pontic–Caspian steppe (and therefore with the Proto-Indo-Europeans according to the mainstream Kurgan hypothesis). There are Iron Age specimens are identified with the Scythians and medieval examples with Turkic peoples. Such stelae are found in large numbers in Dnipropetrovsk, Kherson and Nikolaev.
  Kodak fortress was a fort built in 1635 by the order of Polish king Władysław IV Vasa and the Sejm over the Dnieper River, near what was to become the town of Stari Kodaky (by modern day: Dnipro). It was constructed by Stanisław Koniecpolski to control Cossacks of Zaporizhian Sich, prevent Ukrainian peasants from joining forces with the Cossacks and guard the southeastern corner of the Polish–Lithuanian Commonwealth. The Poles tried to establish order in that area, and commissioned French military cartographer and engineer William le Vasseur de Beauplan to construct it. The fortress cost around 100,000 Polish zlotys. The dragoon garrison was commanded by the French officer Jean de Marion. Soviet government attempted to destroy the remnants of the fortress in order to eradicate traces of Polish influences on Ukraine by setting a quarry on that site in 1944. The quarry was closed in 1994, but at that time two-thirds of the fortress had been destroyed. Today the site is just ruins, but it is a popular tourist attraction.
  The Saviour's Transfiguration Cathedral (Ukrainian: Спасо-Преображенський кафедральний собор) is the main Orthodox church of Dnipro, Ukraine. The foundation stone was laid in 1786 by Catherine II of Russia and Emperor Joseph II. The event is described in the memoirs of comte de Ségur. Prince Grigory Potemkin envisioned the church as one of the spiritual centres of New Russia. Ivan Starov submitted to Potemkin his designs for a Roman-style basilica, but construction was postponed until the end of the Russo-Turkish War.

Symbols

A Cossack with a musket was an emblem of the Zaporizhian Host and later the state emblem of the Hetmanate and the Ukrainian State. The origin of the emblem is uncertain, while its first records date back to 1592. On the initiative of Pyotr Rumyantsev the emblem was phased out and replaced by the Russian double-headed eagle in 1767.

A Cossack with a rifle was restored by the Hetman of Ukraine Pavlo Skoropadsky in 1918. However, later the emblem disappeared again until in 2005 it reappeared on the proposed Great Seal of Ukraine. In 2002 was adopted flag and identical coat of arms of Oblast, which consists of cossack with musket and nine yellow eight-pointed stars. Stars represent coat of arms of Yekaterinoslav Governorate which also consisted of imperial monogram of Catherine the Great.

 Other symbols
 Official plants are wheat, acanthus and oak.
 Per aspera ad astra is a motto of the region.

See also
 Subdivisions of Ukraine
 Privat Group

References

External links
 
 Official site of Dnipropetrovsk Oblast Administration 
 Information Card of the Region Cabinet of Ministers of Ukraine 
 

 
Oblasts of Ukraine
States and territories established in 1946
Soviet toponymy in Ukraine
1946 establishments in Ukraine